GL Golf is a 3D Golf game based on OpenGL for macOS designed by Nuclear Nova Software. It mimics a golf game with such common items as 504 different holes, sand traps, lakes, trees, a driving range and various golf clubs. The current version is 2.33.

Current Development
With over 55 updates, GL Golf has been actively developed since 2003. The users and developers share ideas through email and on the GL Golf forum.

iPhone OS version
A slimmed down version of GL Golf is also available on iOS via the App Store.

See also
PGA Tour (video game series)

References
GL Golf official website
GL Golf on iTunes

External links

Golf video games
MacOS games
IOS games